"In a Minute" is a song by American rapper Lil Baby. It was released a single through Quality Control Music and Motown on April 8, 2022, concurrently with another single, "Right On". The song was produced by Kaigoinkrazy and co-produced by Haze. It samples English singer and songwriter Ellie Goulding's track, "Don't Say a Word", from her second studio album, Halcyon (2012). This is Lil Baby's 100th entry on the Billboard Hot 100 on the chart dating April 23, becoming the youngest artist to accumulate 100 entries on the Hot 100, a record previously achieved by Justin Bieber.

Credits and personnel

 Lil Baby – vocals, songwriting
 Ellie Goulding – songwriting
 Jim Eliot – songwriting
 Kai "Kaigoinkrazy" Hasegawa – songwriting
 Howard New AKA George Flynn - songwriting
 Ethan "Haze" Hayes – co-production, songwriting
 Thomas "Tillie" Mann – mixing
 Stephen "Dot Com" Farrow – mixing assistance
 Colin Leonard – mastering
 Matthew "Mattazik Musik" Robinson – recording
 Angie Randisi – recording

Music video
The official music would be released on April 7, 2022, and it would surpass 100 millions views in December 2022

Charts

Weekly charts

Year-end charts

Certifications

References

2022 singles
2022 songs
Lil Baby songs
Motown singles
Songs written by Lil Baby
Songs written by Ellie Goulding
Songs written by Jim Eliot
Songs written by Howard New